Tarek bin Mohammed bin 'Awad bin Laden (born 1947) is the half-brother of Osama bin Laden, and a member of the Saudi Arabia business community. He was once called "the personification of the dichotomy (conservatism and change) of Saudi Arabia."  He started a textile business with Swedish actor Kjell Bergqvist, intending to make use of some of the large state-owned textile mills in Egypt, and then sell the clothing in the West.  "It didn't work out. The factories in Egypt produced for the Soviet Union and they were poorly designed," Bergqvist recalled.

See also 
Bin Laden family
Bridge of the Horns

References 

1947 births
Living people
Saudi Arabian businesspeople
Tarek